Aaron Dupnai (born 27 August 1968) is a Papua New Guinean long-distance runner. He competed in the men's marathon at the 1988 Summer Olympics.

References

External links
 

1968 births
Living people
Athletes (track and field) at the 1988 Summer Olympics
Papua New Guinean male long-distance runners
Papua New Guinean male marathon runners
Olympic athletes of Papua New Guinea
Athletes (track and field) at the 1990 Commonwealth Games
Commonwealth Games competitors for Papua New Guinea
People from the Western Province (Papua New Guinea)